The United States Mail Steamship Company – also called the United States Mail Line, or the U.S. Mail Line – was a passenger steamship line formed in 1920 by the United States Shipping Board (USSB) to run the USSB's fleet of ex-German ocean liners that had been seized by the United States during World War I or awarded as war reparations after the end of the war. Receivers were appointed for the line after financial improprieties and massive losses came to light. After review of the financial data, a United States District Court ordered that all the U.S. Mail Line ships be returned to the USSB.

Passenger ships of the United States Mail Line 
 
 
 
 
 
 
 
 
 
 
 
 
 SS Talamanca
 SS Segovia (burned in the builder's yard)

References 

 

Transport companies established in 1920
Defunct shipping companies of the United States